The Georgian S7 route (Georgian: საერთაშორისო მნიშვნელობის გზა ს7, Saertashoriso mnishvnelobis gza S7, road of international importance), also known as Marneuli–Sadakhlo (Armenian border), is a "road of international importance" within the Georgian road network and runs from Marneuli to the border with Armenia near Sadakhlo over a distance of , making it the shortest S-highway in Georgia. After crossing the Georgian-Armenian border the highway continues as M6 to Vanadzor, Armenia's third largest city.

The S7 highway is entirely part of European route E001 and the Asian Highway AH81 and connects with the Georgian S6 highway in Marneuli. Furthermore, the road is entirely located in Marneuli Municipality (Kvemo Kartli region) and built as a two lane road. Plans have been developed and international funds have been raised to upgrade the southern part of the S7 to a 2x2 motorway, while a new motorway section will connect the S7 with a redesigned S4 highway near Didi Mughanlo.

Background
From the early 1980s the current S7 route was referred to as A310 within the Soviet road network which extended into the Armenian SSR. At its Marneuli terminus the A310 connected with the A304 highway (now Georgian S6 highway). Prior to the 1980s the route was unnumbered as was the case with most Soviet roads. When Georgia's road numbering system was revised in 1996 the "roads of international importance" (S-)category was introduced and the "S7 Marneuli–Sadakhlo (Armenian border)" replaced the A310 designation.

The S7 is the most popular route to travel between Tbilisi and Yerevan, offering alternative routes within Armenia. Within this project Georgian sections of the E60 (Poti-Tbilisi-Red Bridge, Azerbaijan) and E70 (Poti-Batumi-Sarpi, Turkey) highways are upgraded and integrated to strengthen Georgia's position as South Caucasus transport hub. The East-West Highway project includes redesign of major sections of the Georgian S1, S2, S4, S12 and more recently the S7 highway, to grade-separated highways, mostly as 2x2 expressway.

Future

In 2021 the European Investment Bank provided an additional €106.7 million to Georgia for major upgrades of its East-West Highway. These additional funds are dedicated for a realign and upgrade project involving the S7 and S4 highways. The S4 highway will be rerouted between Rustavi and the Red Bridge border crossing to Azerbaijan and constructed as 2x2 motorway. Halfway this section a new 2x2 motorway will be constructed in southwestern direction towards the current S7 at Kvemo Sarali village. From here the southern  of the S7 to Sadakhlo and the Armenian border will be realigned and rebuild as 2x2 motorway.

Although the S7 is not part of the European E60 or E70 routes, it was included in recent years within the East-West Highway project. The need to bypass Marneuli due to the increasing Armenia bound traffic and the pending realignment of the southern section of the S4 (which was envisioned within the original scope) made this a logical step.

Route

The S7 highway is the shortest S-route in Georgia and begins in Marneuli at the central roundabout junction, where it branches of the S6 highway). Heading south leaving town it crosses the now defunct Marneuli-Bolnisi-Kazreti railway line. The S7 runs parallel to the Tbilisi-Yerevan railway line (which opened in 1899) to the Sadakhlo border crossing through the Marneuli Plains, passing a string of villages along the way. In Shulaveri state route Sh161 provides a shortcut to the Red Bridge border crossing with Azerbaijan and the S4 highway. More than 80% of the population of Marneuli Municipality is of Azeri ethnicity. In the town of Sadakhlo, just a few kilometers from the Armenian border state route Sh37 leads to the small and fourth Georgian-Armenian border crossing in Akhkerpi.

Intersections

References

Roads in Georgia (country)